Pandanus calcicola a species of plant in the family Pandanaceae. It is native to Peninsular Malaysia. Its stems are about one meter tall, while the thick, leathery leaves can be up to 4 meters long. The leaves are slightly paler on the underside and feature reticulate venation. Terminal, spike inflorescences with long peduncles give way to drupes.

References

Flora of Peninsular Malaysia
calcicola